College of San Jose is an educational institution in Villafranca de los Barros, Spain. It was founded by the Society of Jesus in 1893. It includes primary through baccalaureate, and includes a student residence for men and women. Special activities include artistic-training, volunteering and solidarity projects, and pilgrimages. It received silver quality certification from EFQM.

Enrollment has risen to 750 students (448 male, 294 female), with 182 full-time residents. Total staff numbers 111, including 2 Jesuits.

Notable alumni

 Guillermo Fernández Vara - politician
 Carlos Jean - DJ
 Rafael Sánchez Ferlosio - escritor
 César Cernuda - presidente Microsoft LATAM
José Manuel Soto- cantante
 Antonio de Vargas-Zúñiga, Marquis of Siete Iglesias - History Academician

See also
 List of Jesuit sites

References  

Secondary schools in Spain
Jesuit secondary schools in Spain
Catholic schools in Spain
Educational institutions established in 1893
1893 establishments in Spain